Dyscrasis hendeli is a species of picture-winged fly in the genus Dyscrasis of the family Ulidiidae.

Distribution
Mexico, United States.

References

Ulidiidae
Taxa named by John Merton Aldrich
Insects described in 1932
Diptera of North America